Diary-X (commonly abbreviated dx) was an online journaling service which allowed users to create and maintain a journal or diary.  It was launched in 2000, and between half and three-quarters of its users were 14–19 years old.  Basic use was free, though for a small fee users could email their entries.  The creator and webmaster was Stephen Deken.  In early 2006, the server's hard drive failed, and since there was no backup, the entire website and all users' diaries were lost irretrievably.

See also

References

blog hosting services
defunct social networking services
internet properties disestablished in 2006
internet properties established in 2000